Sue (Susan) Armstrong (born December 14, 1973 in Lloydminster, Saskatchewan) is a former field hockey player from Canada, who earned 51 caps for the Women's Senior National Team during her career.

On the national level Armstrong, who was a resident of Edmonton, Alberta, played for Edmonton Women's FHA and the University of Alberta Pandas.

International senior tournaments
 1997 – World Cup Qualifier, Harare, Zimbabwe (11th)
 1998 – Commonwealth Games, Kuala Lumpur, Malaysia (not ranked)
 1999 – Pan American Games, Winnipeg, Manitoba, Canada (3rd)

External links
 

1973 births
Living people
Canadian female field hockey players
Commonwealth Games competitors for Canada
Field hockey players at the 1998 Commonwealth Games
Sportspeople from Edmonton
Sportspeople from Lloydminster